Chief Minister of Sindh (—), is the elected head of government of Sindh. Syed Murad Ali Shah is a PPP politician and the current Chief Minister of Sindh.

The Chief Minister is the head of the provincial government alongside the Chief Secretary. The Chief Minister of Sindh is elected by the Provincial Assembly of Sindh and is the leader of the provincial Legislature. The office of Chief Minister is located in Karachi, the capital of the Sindh province and is known as the CM Secretariat.

Eligibility 

The Constitution of Pakistan sets the principle of qualifications which one must meet to be eligible to the office of the Chief Minister. A Chief Minister must be:

 a citizen of Pakistan
 should be a member of the provincial legislature.

The Chief Minister is elected by a majority in the provincial legislative assembly. This is procedurally established by the vote of confidence in the legislative assembly, as suggested by the majority party who is the appointing authority.

List of premiers (pre-partition)

List of Chief Ministers of Sindh  

List of all those who served as Chief Ministers of Sindh as follows

See also 
 Chief Secretary Sindh
 Provincial Assembly of Sindh
 Chief Minister (Pakistan)
 Government of Sindh
 Governor of Sindh
 Chief Minister of Khyber Pakhtunkhwa
 Chief Minister of Punjab
 Chief Minister of Balochistan

References

External links
 Chief Minister's Website

Sindh